The Ministry of the Interior and Justice (or MIJ), was at national executive ministry of the Government of Colombia responsible for the enforcement of both law and  administration of justice, equivalent to the justice and interior ministries of other countries.

Ministers

See also
Ministry of the Interior (Colombia)

References

 
Colombia, Interior and Justice
Colombia, Interior and Justice
Colombia, Interior and Justice
Ministry of the Interior (Colombia)
Ministry of Justice and Law (Colombia)
2002 establishments in Colombia